Jigen-ryū (示現流 lit: revealed reality style) is a traditional school (koryū) of Japanese martial arts founded in the late 16th century by Tōgō Chūi (1560–1643), a.k.a. Tōgō Shigekata, in Satsuma Province, now Kagoshima prefecture, Kyushu, Japan. It focuses mainly on the art of swordsmanship.

Jigen-ryū is known for its emphasis on the first strike: Jigen-ryū teachings state that a second strike is not even to be considered.

The basic technique is to hold the sword in a high version of hasso-no-kamae called tonbo-no-kamae (蜻蛉構 Dragonfly Stance), with the sword held vertically above the right shoulder.  The attack is then done by running forward at your opponent and then cutting diagonally down on their neck.  The kiai is a loud "Ei!".

Traditionally this is practised using a long wooden stick, and cutting against a vertical pole, or even a real tree. During a hard practice, the wood is said to give off the smell of smoke.  During the Edo period, at the height of its popularity, adepts of Jigen-ryū were said to practice  striking the pole 3,000 times in the morning, and another 8,000 times in the afternoon. The style is also famous for his specific and impressive kiai they called Enkyō (monkey's scream).

The style is still taught at the Jigen-ryū practice hall in the city of Kagoshima.

References

External links
Jigen Ryu Togo Foundation Home page of the Jigen-ryū information center in Kagoshima.

Ko-ryū bujutsu
Japanese martial arts